Melospiza is a genus of passerine birds formerly placed in the family Emberizidae, but it is now placed in Passerellidae. The genus, commonly referred to as "song sparrows," currently contains three species, all of which are native to North America.

Members of Melospiza are medium-sized sparrows with long tails, which are pumped in flight and held moderately high on perching. They are not seen in flocks, but as a few individuals or solitary. They prefer brushy habitats, often near water.

Species of Melospiza

See also  
 American sparrows

References  
 Sparrow characteristics

External links 
 ITIS

 
Bird genera
American sparrows